General elections were held in Puerto Rico on 4 November 1980. Carlos Romero Barceló of the New Progressive Party (PNP) was re-elected Governor. In the House of Representatives elections the PNP received a plurality of votes, but the  Popular Democratic Party won a majority of the seats. They also won a majority of seats in the Senate. Voter turnout was 88.30%.

Results

Governor

Resident Commissioner

House of Representatives

Senate

References

Puerto
General elections in Puerto Rico
Elections
Puerto Rico